is a Japanese politician of the Constitutional Democratic Party, a member of the House of Councillors, the upper house of Japan's parliament, from the Ibaraki constituency. He is now the DPJ Next Vice Minister of Defense,  the DPJ  Next Vice Minister for the Abduction Issue, and the Director of Special Committee on North Korea Abduction Issue and Related Matter. He also is a member of Committee on Foreign Affairs and defense. He is a Former Senior Vice Minister of Finance. In the House of Councillors he is a former Chair of the Committee on Financial Affairs.[1] He also is a former Director-General of the DPJ's International Department and a former Chair of the House of Councillors' Special Committee on North Korean Abductions and Other Issues. Fujita is a native of Hitachi, Ibaraki and graduate of Keio University, Faculty of Letters.

Early life and career
Fujita was born April 19, 1950, in Hitachi, Ibaraki. He graduated from Ibaraki University Junior High School in 1966, and Mito Dai-ichi High School in 1969. He attended the Department of Philosophy, the Faculty of Letters of Keio University and graduated with a B.A. in 1975.

From 1975 to 1977, Fujita participated in the Moral Re-Armament (MRA, now Initiatives of Change) Goodwill Ambassador "Song of Asia" program, and visited 14 countries with 50 youths from 15 countries in Asia and Oceania staying at about 100 homes in those countries he visited. He has visited 48 countries and has participated in volunteer work in many of those countries.  He has had homestays in over 200 homes. Fujita is a founding member of The Association for Aid and Relief Association for Aid and Relief, an NGO founded in 1979, and later became a member of the board of directors. In 1984, he became a member of the board of directors of the International MRA Association of Japan (Now International IC Association of Japan).

In 1996, Fujita, as a member of the original Democratic Party Of Japan, was first elected to the House of Representatives, the lower house of Japan's parliament. He represented the Tokyo proportional representation constituency and was elected with the support of Yukio Hatoyama who later became Prime Minister of Japan. Fujita became known as the country's first national politician with an international NGO background. After losing the 2000 re-election against Eita Yashiro, Fujita served as a policy advisor for Hatoyama, and was elected to the House of Representatives for the second time in 2003. Fujita lost in the 2005 election against  Akihiro Ota. In 2007, when the incumbent Moto Kobayashi retired, Fujita ran for election in the House of Councillors. He won Kobayashi's seat, representing Ibaraki, a constituency which tends to be a Liberal Democratic Party (LDP) stronghold. Fujita received 540,174 votes, which is a record for a DPJ member in Ibaraki.

In 2009, he became the director-general of the International Department, the director of the Committee on Financial Affairs, and the member of the Committee on Audit. In 2010, he was sent by the Democratic Party to facilitate aid efforts following the earthquake in Haiti.  In the same year, he was appointed as the chairman of the Committee on Financial Affairs in the House of Councillors.  In 2011, he was appointed senior vice minister of finance. In 2012, he became a director, Committee on Fundamental National Policies and member, Judge Impeachment Court.  In 2013, he became the chairman of the Committee on Financial Affairs, and later served as chairman, Committee on Fundamental National Policies.  His current positions are shadow Vice Minister of Defense, shadow Vice Minister for the Abduction Issue, director, The Special Committee on The North Korea Abduction Issue and Related Matters, and member, Committee on Foreign Affairs and Defense.

Political positions and policies

Diet Members' League activities

President, Diet Members' League to promote voting by overseas Japanese

President, Diet Members' League for international peace building
 
President, Diet Members' League to promote International Initiatives of Change (IC)
  
Vice President, Diet Members' League to support ex-Japanese POWs in Siberia

Member, Diet Members' League to vitalize shopping streets

Member, Diet Members' League to promote policies to get out of deflation

 Fujita's political slogan is: "From Tears To Smiles."
 In his first term as a member of the House of Representatives, Fujita, as the Secretary General of the Diet Members' League for a Total Ban on Anti-Personnel Landmines, helped Foreign Minister Keizo Obuchi to sign the Ottawa Treaty.

Humanitarian assistance in emergency and disaster situations
 In April 2004, the DPJ sent Fujita to Jordan as the Director-General of the DPJ's International Department to rescue the Japanese NGO workers and journalists who were kidnapped in neighboring Iraq.
 The DPJ sent Fujita to provide operational assistance to Indonesia and Sri Lanka after the 2004 Indian Ocean earthquake and tsunami.
 The DPJ sent Fujita Pakistan after the 2005 Kashmir earthquake.
 In January, 2010, the DPJ sent Fujita to Haiti after the earthquake.
 In January, 2008, Fujita joined the Diet Members' League to Promote Raising the Legal Status of Korean and Other Settled Foreign Residents, which aims to enfranchise Korean and other permanent foreign residents.

Issues and questions raised in the Japanese Parliament
Fujita, is known for confronting difficult issues in the Japanese parliament. He secured a significant,  first-ever admission from Aso Mining regarding their use of war prisoners. Additionally, he focused government attention on establishing clear guidelines regarding Japan's use of its Self-Defense Force to combat piracy. He also raised important questions related to how the Japanese government was helping the families of the Japanese victims of the attacks of September 11, 2001.

Views on POW and war-related issues
Much of Fujita's political career has been heavily invested in reconciliation issues. In Japan, he's known for his decades of tireless pursuit on the matter of Japan's wartime treatment of prisoners of war and for advocating the nation's need to make past wrongs right.

November 2008 led to Fujita questioning Prime Minister Taro Aso at the Committee on Foreign Affairs and Defense on whether Aso Mining (owned by the Aso family) had abused Allied prisoners of war (POWs) during the Second World War. Prime Minister Aso responded: "I was four, maybe five years old at the time. I was too young to recognize anything at that age." On December 18 of that year, and in response to a request by Fujita, The Ministry of Health and Labor Welfare released the documents that confirmed that Aso Mining had used 101 British, 197 Australian and 2 Dutch prisoners of war to dig coal in its mine. In response to things coming to light, Fujita is quoted as saying, "I suppose that as he has held several positions in government, including serving as foreign minister, he hoped there would be little chance of this being exposed.... It is, of course, related to war repatriations for individuals who suffered during the war, which the government does not want to pay and claims the issues have been settled...."

In January 2009, Prime Minister Aso acknowledged in the Diet for the first time that Aso Mining used Allied POWs during World War Two. Significant, in light of the fact that Prime Minister Aso refused to acknowledge that truth for 64 years. In February 2009, Fujita organized "The Debrief Meeting on Aso Mining's Use of Prisoners of War (POW) Labor" at the Diet Members' Building. At the meeting, Fujita noted Prime Minister Aso's comment before the Committee on Foreign Affairs and Defense but added, "The survivors and [POW's] families want an apology and compensation from Prime Minister Aso."

Use of the Japanese Self-Defense Force to combat piracy
In response to increasing levels of aggression on Japanese maritime interests traveling off the coast of Somalia and utilizing the Suez Canal between 2007 and 2008, the government was compelled to re-examine national security issues in relationship to international piracy.

At the DPJ's Committee for Foreign Affairs and Defense in February 2009, on the topic of sending the Self-Defense Force to the coast of Somalia as an anti-piracy measure, Fujita focused government attention on establishing clear guidelines on Japan's use of the Self-Defense Forces to combat piracy. Fujita called for the government to formulate a clear definition of "pirate" that went beyond the acts of piracy outlined under Japan's 1907 Penal Code, Act No. 45. He also pushed for obtaining detailed information about piracy elsewhere in the world.

References

 "Yukihisa Fujita". Democratic Party of Japan. http://www.dpj.or.jp/english/member/?detail_302=1. Retrieved 2 December 2009.

Books

Other publications
1. United Nations and Global Civil Society — A New Horizon (Co-Authored, 2006)

2. A Politician Who Did Not Want to Become Politician – Roles of NGO in Politics (2003)

3. World Peace from the Perspective of Religion (1991)

4. Japan's Decisive Decade (Translation, 1990)

5. Flame in the darkness on USSR Dissents (Translation, 1981)

Articles
1. Aso Mining's Indelible Past : Prime Minister Aso should seek reconciliation with former POWs (Japan Focus, Msy2009)

2. Russia Moving Towards Autocracy and Hegemonism (Oct 2006)

3. Prime Minister Kishi's Diplomacy of Reconciliation （Japan echo, Aug 2006）

4. Lessons to be Learned in the Emergency Relief Operations (Oct 2006)

5. Indian Ocean tsunami and Pakistan earthquake （Aug 2006）

6. The Role of NGO Diplomacy in the Conflict Resolution （June 2002）

7. Replacing the Cycle of Retaliation by Reconciliation (Sep 2001)

8. Political Solutions for the Pacific War Compensation Lawsuit by the US Prisoners of War (Sep 2001)

External links
 Official website (in Japanese)
 

1950 births
Living people
People from Mito, Ibaraki
Keio University alumni
Members of the House of Representatives (Japan)
Members of the House of Councillors (Japan)
Democratic Party of Japan politicians
21st-century Japanese politicians
9/11 conspiracy theorists
Japanese conspiracy theorists
Politicians from Ibaraki Prefecture